MF  Bartol Kašić is a ferry (named after the Croatian linguist Bartol Kašić), built in 1989, operated by Croatian state-owned company Jadrolinija, and navigating on local routes in Croatia. Capacity of the ship is 500 passengers, 54 cars. Maximum speed is 13 knots.

Accidents
In 2006, while docking to the port of Split, the ship hit the shore due to the failure of both engines, wherefore was unable to speed astern. The captain unsuccessfully tried to stop the ship by dropping both anchors. Few passengers were injured and few cars damaged.

In October 2009, while docking to the port of Žalić, at the island of Silba, the ship hit the pier and the hull was punctured, but water did not penetrate inside, since the damage occurred above the waterline.

In July 2009 the ship hit the shore at the same port.

Gallery

References

Ferries of Croatia
Ships built in Yugoslavia
1989 ships